George Tawlon Manneh Oppong Ousman Weah (born 1 October 1966) is a Liberian politician and former professional footballer who is the incumbent president of Liberia, serving in office since 2018. Prior to his election to the presidency, Weah served as Senator from Montserrado County. He played as a striker in his prolific 18-year professional football career, which ended in 2003. He is the first African former professional footballer to become a head of state.

After beginning his career in his native Liberia, Weah spent 14 years playing for clubs in France, Italy and England. Arsène Wenger first brought him to Europe, signing him for Monaco in 1988. Weah moved to Paris Saint-Germain in 1992 where they won the Ligue 1 in 1994 and became the top scorer of the 1994–95 UEFA Champions League. He signed for AC Milan in 1995 where he spent four successful seasons, winning the Serie A twice. He moved to the Premier League towards the end of his career and had spells at Chelsea and Manchester City, winning the FA Cup at the former, before returning to France to play for Marseille in 2001. He ended his career with Al Jazira in 2003. FourFourTwo named Weah one of the best players never to win the UEFA Champions League.

Weah represented Liberia at the international level, winning 75 caps and scoring 18 goals for his country and playing at the African Cup of Nations on two occasions. He also played an international friendly in 2018, where his number 14 jersey was retired. Regarded as one of the best players never to have played at the World Cup, Scott Murray in The Guardian refers to Weah as "hamstrung by hailing from a global minnow".

Widely regarded as one of the greatest African players of all time, in 1995, Weah was named FIFA World Player of the Year and won the Ballon d'Or, becoming the first and only player to win these awards while representing an African country internationally. In 1989, 1994 and 1995, he was also named the African Footballer of the Year, and in 1996, he was named African Player of the Century. Known for his acceleration, speed, and dribbling ability, in addition to his goalscoring and finishing, Weah was described by FIFA as "the precursor of the multi-functional strikers of today". In 2004, he was named by Pelé in the FIFA 100 list of the world's greatest living players.

Weah became involved in politics in Liberia following his retirement from football. He formed the Congress for Democratic Change and ran unsuccessfully for president in the 2005 election, losing to Ellen Johnson Sirleaf in the second round of voting. In the 2011 election, he ran unsuccessfully for vice president alongside Winston Tubman. Weah was subsequently elected to the Liberian Senate for Montserrado County in the 2014 elections. Weah was elected President of Liberia in the 2017 election, defeating the incumbent vice president Joseph Boakai and was sworn in on 22 January 2018.

Early life and education
Weah was born and raised in the Clara Town district of Monrovia. He is a member of the Kru ethnic group, which hail from south-eastern Liberia's Grand Kru County, one of the poorest areas of the country. His father, William T. Weah Sr., was a mechanic while his mother, Anna Quayeweah (d. 2013), was a seller. He has three brothers, William, Moses and Wolo. He was one of thirteen children largely raised by his devoutly Christian paternal grandmother, Emma Klonjlaleh Brown after his parents separated when George was still a baby. He attended middle school at Muslim Congress and high school at Wells Hairston High School, and reportedly dropped out in his final year of studies. He began to play football for the Young Survivors youth club at the age of 15 and later moved to other local football clubs, assuming starring roles for Mighty Barrolle and Invicible Eleven. Before his football career allowed him to move abroad, Weah worked for the Liberia Telecommunications Corporation as a switchboard technician.

Football career

Club career

Early career in Liberia, Cameroon, Monaco and France

After playing in the Liberian domestic league at the beginning of his successful career and winning several national honors (including the Liberian Premier League and the Liberian Cup), Weah's abilities were discovered by the Cameroon national team coach, Claude Le Roy, who relayed the news to Arsène Wenger. Weah moved to Europe in 1988, for just £12,000 from Cameroonian club Tonnerre Yaoundé, when he was signed by Wenger – the manager of Monaco at the time – who flew to Africa himself prior to the signing, and whom Weah credits as an important influence on his career. During his time with Monaco, Weah won the African Footballer of the Year for the first time in 1989; this was his first major award and he took it back home for the entire country to celebrate. Weah also won the Coupe de France in 1991, and he helped Monaco reach the final of the European Cup Winners' Cup in 1992, scoring four goals in nine cup appearances.

Weah subsequently played for Paris Saint-Germain (1992–95), with whom he won the Coupe de France in 1993 and 1995, the French league in 1994, and the Coupe de la Ligue in 1995 during a highly prolific and successful period; he also became the top scorer of the 1994–95 UEFA Champions League, with seven goals, after reaching the semi-finals with the club, one of which was a skilful individual "wonder-goal" against Bayern Munich in the group stage, on 23 November 1994. During his time at the club, he also managed to reach the semi-finals of the 1992–93 UEFA Cup, and the semi-finals of the 1993–94 European Cup Winners' Cup; in total, he scored 16 goals in 25 European games. In 1994, he won the African Footballer of the Year Award for the second time in his career.

AC Milan and individual success

Weah joined AC Milan in 1995, with whom he immediately won the Italian league in 1996 under Fabio Capello, playing alongside Roberto Baggio and Dejan Savićević in Milan's attack, as well as Marco Simone, on occasion, and finishing the season as Milan's top goalscorer; he won the Serie A title once again in 1999. During his time with the club, he also reached the 1998 Coppa Italia final, and finished as runner-up in the Supercoppa Italiana on two occasions, in 1996 and 1999. Despite their European dominance in the early 1990s, Milan were less successful in Europe during this time, however, with their best result being a quarter-final finish in the 1995–96 UEFA Cup.

Exhibiting skill, athleticism and goalscoring prowess, Weah became famous at Milan for scoring several notable goals, in particular a solo goal against Hellas Verona at the San Siro which saw him deftly control the ball from Verona's corner kick just outside his own penalty area, before he set off. With all his teammates back defending the corner Weah made a beeline for goal, leaving his own teammates in his wake. His teammate Zvonimir Boban stated, "It was an incredible run. We were thinking, 'When's he going to stop? When's he going to stop? He's not going to stop! He's never going to stop!'". Weah finished by rifling the ball into the bottom left corner before an exuberant goal celebration.

Due to his performances with both Paris Saint-Germain and Milan, in 1995 Weah was the recipient of several individual awards: he won the Ballon d'Or, the Onze d'Or, and was named FIFA World Player of the Year, becoming the first and, currently, only African player (by FIFA nationality) to win these awards, and second African-born player to do so after Eusébio.  Weah dedicated his FIFA World Player of the Year victory to his former manager, Arsène Wenger, stating that it was thanks to him that he was able to develop into a world class player. That year, Weah also won the African Player of the Year Award for the third time in his career, and was named to the Onze de Onze by the French football magazine Onze Mondial. In 1996, Weah finished second in the FIFA World Player of the Year ranking; he was also the recipient of the FIFA Fair Play Award, and was voted the African Player of the Century by sport journalists from around the world.

Weah was banned from six European matches for breaking the nose of the Portuguese defender Jorge Costa on 20 November 1996 in the players' tunnel after Milan's draw at Porto in the Champions League. Weah said he exploded in frustration after putting up with racist tauntings from Costa during both of the teams' Champions League matches that autumn. Costa strenuously denied the accusations of racism and was not charged by UEFA as no witnesses could verify Weah's allegations, not even his Milan teammates. Weah later attempted to apologize to Costa but this was rebuffed by the Portuguese, who considered the charges of racist insults leveled against him to be defamatory and took Weah to court. The incident led to Costa undergoing facial surgery and he was subsequently sidelined for three weeks. Despite the incident, Weah still received the FIFA Fair Play Award in 1996.

Time in England

Weah signed for Premier League club Chelsea on loan from Milan on 11 January 2000, in a deal which would keep him with the West London club until the end of the 1999–2000 English season. Although past his prime, Weah's time in England was deemed a success, especially at Chelsea where he instantly endeared himself to their fans by scoring the winner against rivals Tottenham Hotspur on his debut, and scored further league goals against Wimbledon and Liverpool. He also scored twice in Chelsea's victorious 1999–2000 FA Cup netting crucial goals against Leicester City and Gillingham. This led to him starting in the final, which Chelsea won 1–0.

Chelsea manager Gianluca Vialli did not make Weah's move permanent, and, on 1 August 2000, he officially left Milan, and signed for newly promoted Premier League side Manchester City on a free transfer on a two-year contract worth £30,000 a week, declining the offer of a £1 million pay-off from Milan owner Silvio Berlusconi. He played 11 games in all competitions for City, scoring four times, before leaving on 16 October 2000 after becoming dissatisfied with manager Joe Royle for selecting him as a substitute too frequently; he had only played the full 90 minutes in three of his 11 games for the Maine Road club. At City, he scored once in the league against Liverpool (as he did at Chelsea), and three times against Gillingham (again as he had at Chelsea), this time in the League Cup; once in the first leg and twice in the second.

Later career
Following his time in England, Weah returned to France and had a spell at Marseille, where he remained until May 2001. He later played with Al-Jazira in the UAE Pro-League, where he remained until his retirement as a player in 2003, at age 37. He had planned on joining the New York/New Jersey MetroStars of Major League Soccer, but elected to join Al-Jazira on a temporary basis.

International career
Since making his debut for the Liberia national team against Sierra Leone in 1986, Weah played 75 games over 20 years, scoring 18 goals. Representing one of the smaller nations in world football and perennial underdogs, Weah did much to support the national squad: aside from being the team's star player, he also later coached the squad and even funded his national side to a large extent. Despite his efforts, he was unsuccessful in helping Liberia qualify for a single FIFA World Cup, falling just a point short in qualifying for the 2002 tournament. However, he did help Liberia to qualify for the African Cup of Nations on two occasions: Weah represented his country in the 1996 and 2002 editions of the tournament, although Liberia failed to make it out of their group both times, suffering first-round eliminations.

Weah has been named by several media outlets as one of the best players to never play at the World Cup.

Weah returned to the national team for a specially arranged friendly against Nigeria on 11 September 2018, his final international appearance, playing at the age of 51 while in office as the country's president. His number 14 shirt, worn at his playing peak, was retired after the friendly, with Weah receiving a standing ovation when he was substituted.

Style of play

Player profile

During his prime in the 1990s, Weah was regarded as one of the best strikers in the world. He was lauded for his speed, work-rate, stamina, and attacking instincts, as well as his physical and athletic attributes, which he combined with his finishing, technical ability and creativity. A fast, powerful, physically strong player, with an eye for goal, many observers agree that he successfully filled the void left in the Milan attack by club great Marco van Basten. In addition to his pace, acceleration, dribbling skills, and goalscoring ability, as a multi-functional forward Weah was also a team player who was capable of creating chances and assisting goals for teammates.

Along with Ronaldo and Romário, Weah was viewed as a modern, new style of striker in the 1990s who would also operate outside the penalty area and run with the ball towards goal, at a time when strikers primarily operated inside the penalty area where they would receive the ball from teammates. Among the next generation of strikers who were inspired, Thierry Henry states, "George Weah, Romário, and Ronaldo changed the game for me. It was the first time as a striker I saw players that could score on their own. Pick the ball up anywhere and score. Before as a number nine, people would say ‘stay within the line of the box, don’t move too much, don’t go to the wings, don’t drop, stay.’ Then I saw George Weah. And then I saw Ronaldo. And I saw Romário in a different way before those two. And it was like ‘hang on a minute, someone has lied to me’."

One such goal that exemplified this ability was against Verona in 1995 where he received the ball in the edge of his own penalty box and ran the length of the field. Scoring such a goal in Serie A – the best defensive league in the world – saw media outlets such as Gazzetta dello Sport running pages of analysis for days afterwards, and calling it the greatest strike of all in Italian football. On his impact on the sport, Weah states, "When I look at my idols – Pelé, Maradona, Beckenbauer, Cruyff – they did a lot of great things. I came into the game and made history too."

Reception

Named African Footballer of the Year three times and the first African to win the Ballon d'Or and be named FIFA World Player of the Year, Weah's prominence in the 1990s led him to be nicknamed "King George". Regarded as one of the greatest African footballers of all time, Weah was named African Player of the Century in 1996, and is usually ranked among the three greatest African strikers ever, alongside Didier Drogba and Samuel Eto'o. In 2013, Milan great Franco Baresi named Weah in the greatest XI he has ever played with. FourFourTwo magazine named Weah one of the best players never to win the UEFA Champions League. A number of publications, including Scott Murray of The Guardian and Kevin Baxter of the Los Angeles Times, in addition to FIFA, consider him to be one of the greatest players never to feature at the World Cup.

The status of Weah in the sport saw him feature in EA Sports' FIFA video game series where he was named in the Ultimate Team Legends in FIFA 14. During his playing career Weah was sponsored by sportswear company Diadora, and he became famous for his red Diadora boots while playing for AC Milan.

Career statistics

Club

International 
Scores and results list Liberia's goal tally first, score column indicates score after each Weah goal.

Honors
Mighty Barrolle
Liberian Premier League: 1985–86
Liberian Cup: 1985–86

Invincible Eleven
Liberian Premier League: 1986–87

Monaco
Coupe de France: 1990–91

Paris Saint-Germain
Ligue 1: 1993–94
Coupe de France: 1992–93, 1994–95
Coupe de la Ligue: 1994–95

AC Milan
Serie A: 1995–96, 1998–99

Chelsea
FA Cup: 1999–2000

Liberia
CSSA Nations Cup runner-up: 1987

Individual
African Footballer of the Year: 1989, 1994, 1995
World XI: 1991, 1996 (Reserve), 1997, 1998
French Division 1 Foreign Player of the Year: 1990–91
UEFA Champions League Top Scorer: 1994–95
BBC African Footballer of the Year: 1995
Onze d'Or: 1995
Ballon d'Or: 1995
RSSSF Player of the Year: 1995
El País King of European Soccer: 1995
FIFA World Player of the Year: 1995
ESM Team of the Year: 1995–96
Onze d'Argent: 1996
FIFA Fair Play Award: 1996
FIFA World Player of the Year – Silver award: 1996
Planète Foot's 50 Best Players of all Time: 1996
IFFHS African Player of the Century: 1999
World Soccer's 100 Greatest Footballers of All Time: 1999
Placar's 100 Stars of the Century: 1999
FIFA 100: 2004
Arthur Ashe Courage Award 2004
Golden Foot Legends Award: 2005
AC Milan Hall of Fame
IFFHS Legends
World Hall of Fame of Soccer
Honorary Doctor of Humane Letters degree from Cuttington University: 29 June 2018.
France Football Légendes Africaines Top-30: 2019
 IFFHS All-time Africa Men's Dream Team: 2021

Humanitarianism 
Weah is a devoted humanitarian for his war-torn country. During his playing career he became a UN Goodwill Ambassador. At the 2004 ESPY Awards at the Kodak Theatre, Los Angeles, Weah won the Arthur Ashe Courage Award for his efforts. He has also been named a UNICEF Goodwill Ambassador, a role which he has suspended in his political career. Off the football pitch, he stood out throughout his career for his initiatives to fight against racism in the game.

Football and children
Weah has tried to use football as a way to bring happiness and promote education for children in Liberia. In 1998, Weah launched a CD called Lively Up Africa featuring the singer Frisbie Omo Isibor and eight other African football stars. The proceeds from this CD went to children's programs in the countries of origin of the athletes involved.

Weah was President of the Junior Professionals, a former football team he founded in Monrovia in 1994. As a way to encourage young people to remain in school, the club's only requirement for membership was school attendance. Many of the young people, recruited from all over Liberia, went on to play for the Liberian national team. Weah was also actively involved with youth programs in a Liberian enclave on Staten Island, New York, when he resided there for a time.

Football academies
The Diya Group chairman and Indian entrepreneur Nirav Tripathi announced a multimillion-dollar partnership with Weah in 2016, whereby global football academies would be established to help assist youth in both impoverished and emerging nations.

The motivation for the academies is cited as a shared experience between both Tripathi and Weah in how sport can transform lives in their nations of India and Liberia, which both still suffer from severe poverty.

Political career

2005 presidential bid 
Following the end of the Second Liberian Civil War, Weah announced his intention to run for President of Liberia in the 2005 elections, forming the Congress for Democratic Change to back his candidacy. While Weah was a popular figure in Liberia, opponents cited his lack of formal education as a handicap to his ability to lead the country, in contrast with his Harvard-educated opponent, Ellen Johnson Sirleaf. Analysts also noted Weah's lack of experience, calling him a "babe-in-the-woods", while Sirleaf had served as minister of finance in the Tolbert administration in the 1970s and had held positions at Citibank, the World Bank and the United Nations. Weah's eligibility to run for presidency was also called into question as it was reported that he had become a French citizen in his footballing career at Paris St. Germain, but these complaints were rebuffed by the electoral commission in court and Weah was allowed to proceed.

Weah obtained a plurality of votes in the first round of voting on 11 October, garnering 28.3% of the vote. This qualified him to compete in a run-off election against Sirleaf, the second placed candidate. However, he lost the run-off to Sirleaf on 8 November, garnering only 40.6% to 59.4% for Sirleaf. Weah alleged that the election had been rigged through voter intimidation and ballot tampering, and many of his supporters protested the results in the streets of Monrovia. However, after assurances that the vote was fair, several prominent African leaders called on Weah's supporters to accept the result with grace and dignity, and Sirleaf became president. The African Union had characterized the elections as "peaceful, transparent, and fair".

Weah's lack of education became a campaign issue. He has been highly critical of those who say he is not fit to govern: "With all their education and experience, they have governed this nation for hundreds of years. They have never done anything for the nation." He initially claimed to have a BA degree in Sports Management from Parkwood University in London; however, this is an unaccredited diploma mill, which awards certificates without requiring study. Weah then pursued a degree in business administration at DeVry University in Miami.

2009–2016 
Weah also remained active in Liberian politics, returning from the United States in 2009 to successfully campaign for the Congress for Democratic Change candidate in the Montserrado County senatorial by-election. Some analysts saw these moves as preparation for a repeat run for the Presidency in 2011, and Weah did indeed later announce his intention to challenge Sirleaf in the 2011 election. After a series of failed alliances with other opposition parties, the Congress for Democratic Change chose Weah as its 2011 vice presidential candidate, running with presidential candidate Winston Tubman. However, Sirleaf was re-elected, with the Tubman / Weah ticket receiving only 9.3% of the vote.

In 2014, he ran for election to the Senate as a Congress for Democratic Change candidate in Montserrado County. He was overwhelmingly elected to the Liberian Senate on 20 December 2014. Weah defeated Robert Sirleaf, the son of President Sirleaf, becoming the first Liberian international athlete elected to represent a county in the Legislature. He won a landslide victory, receiving 99,226 votes, which represented 78.0% of the total votes from the 141 polling centers, while Sirleaf, his closest rival received 13,692 votes, which is nearly 11% in the election marred only by a low turnout. Following his election, Weah only occasionally attended sessions of the Senate and did not introduce or sponsor any legislation.

2016 presidential bid 
In April 2016, Weah announced his intention to run for President of Liberia in the 2017 elections, standing for the Coalition for Democratic Change. After winning the first round of the 2017 election with 38.4% of the vote, he and Joseph Boakai of the Unity Party went into the second round of the election. In the second round, Weah was elected President of Liberia, winning a run-off against Vice President Joseph Boakai with more than 60% of the vote.

Presidency 

Weah was sworn in as president on 22 January 2018, making him the fourth youngest-serving president in Africa, marking Liberia's first democratic transition in 74 years. He cited fighting corruption, reforming the economy, combating illiteracy and improving life conditions as the main targets of his presidency. Two other world class African strikers, Didier Drogba and Samuel Eto'o, attended the inauguration.

Domestic policy 
On 29 January 2018, in his first annual message to the national legislature, he reduced his salary and other benefits by 25% with immediate effect. "With the assessment that I gave you earlier of the poor condition of our economy, I believe that it is appropriate that we should all make sacrifices in the interest of our country. According to Article 60 of the Constitution, the salaries of the President and the Vice President are established by the Legislature, and cannot be increased or reduced during the period for which they are elected. However, in view of the very rapidly deteriorating situation of the economy, I am informing you today, with immediate effect, that I will reduce my salary and benefits by 25% and give the proceeds back to the Consolidated Fund for allocation and appropriation as they see fit."

On 29 January 2018, Weah announced he would seek constitutional changes to allow people of "non-Negro" descent to be citizens and allow foreigners to own land. He called the present situation "racist and inappropriate".

On 12 September 2020, he declared a national emergency over sexual violence in the country, pledging to create a special prosecutor for rape, a national sex offender registry, and a national task force to tackle the issue. He further announced a 2 million dollar emergency fund, part of which was used to purchase DNA-testing equipment for forensic identification of perpetrators. However, as of March 2022, the DNA-testing equipment had yet to be made functional. As well, the special prosecutor had yet to be appointed, the sex offender registry had yet to be implemented, and specialized gender-based violence courts had only been implemented in three of the sixteen Liberian counties.

Foreign policy 
Upon his election to office, Weah first made an official visit in Senegal to meet with President Macky Sall, to "strengthen the bond between the two countries". On 21 February 2018, Weah made his first official visit outside Africa, to France, meeting French President Emmanuel Macron. The meeting focused on improving the relationship between France and Liberia and also sought French help for a sports development project in Africa. The meeting was also attended by Didier Drogba, Kylian Mbappé and FIFA president Gianni Infantino.
On 25 May 2018, following a meeting with President Weah, the Liberian Football Association president Musa Bility announced that Liberia would vote for the Canada–Mexico–United States World Cup bid, breaking ranks with the rest of Africa, who were voting for the Moroccan bid.

Criticism

As President, Weah has come under criticism for inciting violence on opposition candidates including Telia Urey in 2019. On August 15, 2022, three senior members of Weah's cabinet were sanctioned by the United States for alleged corruption.

Song 
On 25 March 2020, the Liberian president recorded his song with the local group The Rabbis, the text of which was written by himself. In this song "He invites the Liberian and African population to stand up by all means against this virus [SARS-CoV-2] which is causing damage around the world."It could be your mom, it could be your dad, your brothers or your sisters. Let's all stand together to fight this dirty virus an extract from President Weah's song on a reggae rhythm.

The majority of people in Liberia do not have internet or Facebook access, but everyone listens to the radio. The song will be played on various stations across the country to properly broadcast the message, according to the president's spokesperson. Weah had already recorded a song against Ebola.

Personal life 
Weah has four children; three children with his Jamaican-born wife Clar Weah: George, Tita, and Timothy and a child from another relationship. In 2016, he was sued by the mother of his daughter for child support expenses.
Both of his sons became footballers and signed for Paris Saint-Germain, although only Timothy played for the first team. Both played youth internationals for the United States, and Timothy was capped for the senior team.

Weah practiced Islam for ten years before converting back to Christianity. Currently, Weah again practices Protestantism. In October 2017, he was spotted in the prominent Nigerian church of Pastor T.B. Joshua alongside Liberian Senator Prince Yormie Johnson. Joshua was allegedly a key influence in Johnson's decision to endorse Weah's candidacy in the 2017 Liberian elections.

He holds French citizenship and speaks the French language fluently.

See also

List of association football families
List of sportspeople who served or are serving in political office

References

External links

Player profile and statistics – www.liberiansoccer.com
Criticism of Weah's campaign for presidency
Biography on UNICEF's homepage
Italian Profile

1966 births
Living people
Liberian people of Kru descent
Sportspeople from Monrovia
Liberian footballers
Association football forwards
Mighty Barrolle players
Invincible Eleven players
Africa Sports d'Abidjan players
Tonnerre Yaoundé players
AS Monaco FC players
Paris Saint-Germain F.C. players
A.C. Milan players
Chelsea F.C. players
Manchester City F.C. players
Olympique de Marseille players
Al Jazira Club players
Elite One players
Ligue 1 players
Serie A players
Premier League players
UAE Pro League players
Liberia international footballers
1996 African Cup of Nations players
2002 African Cup of Nations players
African Footballer of the Year winners
Ballon d'Or winners
FIFA 100
FIFA World Player of the Year winners
UEFA Champions League top scorers
Liberian expatriate footballers
Liberian expatriate sportspeople in Ivory Coast
Liberian expatriate sportspeople in Cameroon
Liberian expatriate sportspeople in Monaco
Liberian expatriate sportspeople in France
Liberian expatriate sportspeople in Italy
Liberian expatriate sportspeople in England
Liberian expatriate sportspeople in the United Arab Emirates
Expatriate footballers in Ivory Coast
Expatriate footballers in Cameroon
Expatriate footballers in Monaco
Expatriate footballers in France
Expatriate footballers in Italy
Expatriate footballers in England
Expatriate footballers in the United Arab Emirates
Naturalized citizens of France
Junior Professional FC
DeVry University alumni
Liberian sportsperson-politicians
Congress for Democratic Change politicians
Members of the Senate of Liberia
Presidents of Liberia
Liberian Christians
Liberian former Muslims
Liberian Protestants
Converts to Islam from Protestantism
Converts to Protestantism from Islam
Weah family
21st-century Liberian politicians
FA Cup Final players